Schmidt Futures is a philanthropic venture founded by Eric Schmidt and Wendy Schmidt in 2017. The philanthropy funds science and technology research and talent networking programs. The organization's grants include large-scale "moonshots". Schmidt Futures is based in New York City with offices in Washington, D.C., and London.

Scope of work 
Schmidt Futures funds basic research for the public good in science, technology, and society. The organization searches for talented people and focuses them on hard problems through networks and competitions, new research or policy organizations, and scholarships and fellowships. In addition to basic science, Schmidt Futures also funds innovations toward basic societal needs such as internet access, COVID-19 relief, poverty relief, and relief for emigrants from recent war in Afghanistan and Ukraine.

Programs

Science and technology 
 Advanced computing for scientific research and development
 Artificial intelligence
 Awards for excellence in science communication
 Convergence research
 Open data and open software
 Schmidt Science Fellows
 Science polymath program
 Synthetic biology
 Technology innovation policy

Society and talent 
 Assistance to recent Afghan emigrants and Ukrainian emigrants
 Associate product manager program, based on the Google APM program
 Community-based innovation and growing the middle class
 Entrepreneur in residence program
 Families and workers affected by COVID-19
 High-speed internet access; Reimagine New York for digital equity in New York State
 International strategy forum
 Innovation fellows
 Learning engineering including the Futures Forum on Learning tools competition
 Quad fellowship for scientists and technologists from Australia, India, Japan, and the United States
 Rise global scholarships for young people
Defense Industry
 Center for a New American Security

Notable people 
 Stuart Feldman, chief scientist
 Thomas Kalil, chief innovation officer
 Wanjiru Kamau-Rutenberg, executive director of Rise
 James Manyika, senior advisor
 Eric Schmidt, cofounder
 Wendy Schmidt, cofounder
 Fareed Zakaria, senior advisor

See also
 Schmidt Family Foundation
 Schmidt Ocean Institute

References

External links
 

Charities based in New York City
Educational foundations in the United States
Development charities based in the United States
Information technology charities